Thomas Bruce "Trey" Drechsel III (born July 27, 1996) is an American professional basketball player for EWE Baskets Oldenburg of the Basketball Bundesliga.

Early career
Drechsel attended Cedar Park Christian High School in Bothell, Washington.

Drechsel played four seasons at Western Washington in Bellingham, Washington, from 2014 to 2018. In the 2017–18 season, he was named to the All-GNAC First Team in 2018.

In 2018, Drechsel moved to Grand Canyon for his senior season. He started 25 games and averaged 8.1 points and 5.8 rebounds per game.

Professional career
On July 5, 2020, Drechsel signed his first professional contract, a three-year deal with Partizan NIS of the Adriatic League. On July 31, he was loaned to Mladost Zemun of the Basketball League of Serbia. His loan ended in May 2021. He parted ways with Partizan in August 2021.

On August 30, 2021, Drechsel signed for Stal Ostrów Wielkopolski.

On June 13, 2022, he has signed with EWE Baskets Oldenburg of the Basketball Bundesliga.

References

External links
 Trey Drechsel at eurobasket.com
 Trey Drechsel at proballers.com
 Trey Drechsel at realgm.com

1996 births
Living people
American expatriate basketball people in Serbia
American men's basketball players
Basketball League of Serbia players
Basketball players from Washington (state)
EWE Baskets Oldenburg players
Grand Canyon Antelopes men's basketball players
KK Mladost Zemun players
KK Partizan players
People from Woodinville, Washington
Shooting guards
Sportspeople from King County, Washington
Western Washington Vikings men's basketball players